The members of the 1st Manitoba Legislature were elected in the Manitoba general election held in December 1870, the first general election for the new province. The legislature sat from March 15, 1871, to December 16, 1874.

Lieutenant Governor Adams George Archibald's "Government party" held the balance of power in the assembly with 17 seats. The Canadian Party, also known as the "Loyal party", led by John Christian Schultz, won 5 seats; they demanded swift punishment for the leaders of the Red River Rebellion. Henry Joseph Clarke served as government house leader in the assembly but Lieutenant Governor Archibald performed the functions of Premier. In December 1872, Alexander Morris replaced Archibald as Lieutenant Governor of Manitoba.

In July 1874, a government led by Henry Joseph Clarke was defeated by a motion of non-confidence. Marc-Amable Girard was asked to form a government and was allowed to select the members of his cabinet, thus introducing responsible government to the province. On December 1, 1874, all but one member of the Girard cabinet resigned due to ethnic tensions. Robert Atkinson Davis was asked to form a new government which went to the polls later that month.

Joseph Royal served as speaker for the assembly from 1871 to 1872. Curtis James Bird was speaker from 1873 to 1874.

There were four sessions of the 1st Legislature:

Members of the Assembly 
The following members were elected to the assembly in 1870:

Notes:

By-elections 
By-elections were held to replace members for various reasons:

Notes:

References 

Terms of the Manitoba Legislature
1871 establishments in Manitoba
1874 disestablishments in Manitoba
1871 in Manitoba
1872 in Manitoba
1873 in Manitoba
1874 in Manitoba